The B'nai Israel Synagogue and Cemetery in Thomasville, Georgia was listed on the National Register of Historic Places in 1997.  According to its NRHP nomination, the synagogue "is the most intact example of the few surviving pre-World War II Orthodox synagogues in Georgia. These synagogues were built by Eastern European Jews arriving
between 1881 and 1920."

The Jewish cemetery in Thomasville was established in 1909.  It is located on the northeast outskirts of the town, about a mile from the synagogue.

The synagogue is a one-story gable-front building built in 1913 with Romanesque Revival styling.  It has a pedimented entry flanked by Tuscan columns that was probably added soon after.

The synagogue's membership peaked in 1925 when there were 35 families (over 100 individuals) as members.

The synagogue is also a contributing building in the Thomasville Commercial Historic District.

References

Synagogues on the National Register of Historic Places in Georgia (U.S. state)
Jewish cemeteries in Georgia (U.S. state)
Romanesque Revival architecture in Georgia (U.S. state)
Buildings and structures completed in 1909
National Register of Historic Places in Thomas County, Georgia
Synagogues in Georgia (U.S. state)
Cemeteries in Georgia (U.S. state)
Russian-Jewish culture in the United States
Synagogues completed in 1913